Thumbs Up! is the seventh extended play from South Korean boy band Pentagon. It was released on September 10, 2018, by Cube Entertainment. The album consists of five tracks, including the lead single, "Naughty Boy".

This is the first project from the group to not feature all ten members, in which Yan An and E'Dawn were absent from the comeback, over health concerns and a dating scandal respectively. While he didn't provide his vocals for the album, E'Dawn participated in the composition of several tracks. It was later announced that E'Dawn would be leaving Pentagon on November 14, while Yan An would resume his activities with the group on November 25.

Commercial performance
The EP debuted at number ten on the Korean Gaon Chart in September 2018. The EP sold over 21,585 units in September.

Track listing

Accolades

Charts

References

2018 EPs
Cube Entertainment EPs
Pentagon (South Korean band) EPs
Kakao M EPs
Korean-language EPs
Albums produced by Hui (singer)
Albums produced by Kino (singer)